Cabinet of Vladimir Kokovtsov – composition of the Council of Ministers of the Russian Empire, under the leadership of Vladimir Kokovtsov, worked from September 22, 1911 to February 12, 1914.

Kokovtsov's Cabinet was formed immediately after the murder of Pyotr Stolypin, who served as Prime Minister. Emperor Nicholas II decided to appoint a new Prime Minister Vladimir Kokovtsov, who was Finance Minister in the Cabinet of Stolypin and retained this post in his Cabinet.

Ministers

References

Kokovtsov
Cabinets established in 1911